Malcolm Prince is an English broadcaster and radio producer, much of whose work has been for BBC Radio 2, where he worked from 2000 to 2022.

Life
Prince was born in Solihull, West Midlands, and attended the University of Warwick.

He began his radio career at BRMB Radio in Birmingham. His mentor was Ed Doolan, who took Prince with him to the local BBC Radio station in 1981. In the mid 1990s, Prince sold an idea to BBC World Service which became the series Ain't No Mickey Mouse Business. This marked the first of many collaborations with his long-time collaborator, writer and broadcaster Brian Sibley, with whom Prince has created many programmes for the BBC.

In 2000, Prince became a staff producer at BBC Radio 2 producing a variety of weekly programmes and documentaries, specialising in feature documentaries and music entertainment shows. He has produced several programmes with presenters Paul O'Grady, Graham Norton and Alan Carr. He also produced The Russell Davies Song Show from 2002 to 2004. In September 2004, he created Elaine Paige on Sunday, which he produced until 2010.

In 2003, he produced Radio 2's Great British Music Debate and later executive-produced the two follow-ups in 2004. In 2005 he produced Ricky Gervais and Stephen Merchant's first Radio 2 programmes, as well as the Network debuts of Paul O'Grady and John Barrowman.

In 2006 he became an Executive Producer at Radio 2.

He left the BBC Radio 2 after 22 years in August 2022.

References

Living people
People from Solihull
Year of birth missing (living people)
BBC Radio 2 presenters
English radio producers
Alumni of the University of Warwick